Cecropia utcubambana is a species of plant in the family Urticaceae. It is endemic to Peru.

References

utcubambana
Endemic flora of Peru
Vulnerable plants
Trees of Peru
Taxonomy articles created by Polbot